Women's 3 meter springboard competition at the Beijing 2008 Summer Olympics was held from August 15 to August 17, at the Beijing National Aquatics Center. It is an individual diving competition, with dives performed from a flexible springboard three meters above the surface of the water.

The individual diving competitions all consist of three rounds. In the first, the 30 divers each perform five dives. The top 18 divers advance to the semifinals. Each diver again performs five dives, and the top 12 divers from among those dives advance to the finals. Preliminary scores are ignored at this point, as only the semifinal scores are considered in advancement. In the final round, the divers perform a final set of five dives, with the scores from those dives (and only those dives) used to determine final ranking.

Seven judges evaluate each dive, giving the diver a score between 0 and 10 with increments of 0.5; scores below 7.0 or above 9.5 are rare. The highest and lowest score from each judge are dropped. The remaining five scores are summed, multiplied by 0.6, and multiplied by the degree of difficulty of the dive to give the total score for the dive. Scores from each dive in the round are summed to give the round score.

Results

References
 https://web.archive.org/web/20080916091028/http://results.beijing2008.cn/WRM/ENG/INF/DV/RPT/DVW001901.shtml
 http://sports.espn.go.com/oly/summer08/fanguide/sport?sport=dv

Diving at the 2008 Summer Olympics
2008
2008 in women's diving
Women's events at the 2008 Summer Olympics